Sar Gach (also known as Ābezhdān, Sar Gach-e Ābezhdān, Shūkol-e Sar Gach, and Solţānābād) is a village in Abezhdan Rural District, Abezhdan District, Andika County, Khuzestan Province, Iran. At the 2006 census, its population was 1,239, in 216 families.

References 

Populated places in Andika County